Susanne Luchsinger is a former Swiss curler and curling coach.

At the national level, she is a Swiss women's champion curler (1988).

Teams

Record as a coach of club teams

References

External links
 

Living people
Swiss female curlers
Swiss curling champions
Year of birth missing (living people)
Place of birth missing (living people)
Swiss curling coaches